SS Duchess of York was the name of a couple of ships between 1895–1928.
, a South Eastern Railway passenger ferry
, a Canadian Pacific Railway ocean liner

Ship names